"Not with Me" is a song by Swedish singer Wiktoria. The song was performed for the first time in Melodifestivalen 2019, where it made it to the final. This was her third entry in Melodifestivalen and the first since "As I Lay Me Down" 2017.

Charts

References

2019 singles
English-language Swedish songs
Melodifestivalen songs of 2019
Songs written by Linnea Deb
Songs written by Joy Deb
2019 songs